Joseph Elanga Fils (born 2 May 1979) is a Cameroonian former professional footballer who played as a defender. Starting off his career in Cameroon in the late 1990s, he went on to play professionally in Greece, Sweden, and Denmark before retiring in 2012. A full international between 1998 and 2002, he won 17 caps for the Cameroon national team and represented his country at the 1998 FIFA World Cup.

Club career

Early career
Elanga was born in Yaoundé, Cameroon. After leaving the country in 1998 Elanga started his European career in Greece playing for PAOK and Apollon Kalamarias.

Malmö FF
After a year in each club Elanga left Greece in 2000 to transfer to Swedish club Malmö FF. He stayed at the club for six seasons, playing 130 league games and winning the Swedish championship in 2004.

Denmark
In 2005 Elanga left for Denmark and Brøndby IF. After a couple of tough seasons he went on loan at fellow Danish club AC Horsens. His contract with Brøndby ended in 2009 and Elanga became a free agent.

Return to Malmö and retirement
In early 2010, Elanga announced that he would be training with his old team Malmö FF for a week, a few weeks later he signed a new contract with Malmö and returned to the club after four years. For the 2010 season Elanga had very limited playtime as he was only the second choice for the left back position behind Ricardinho, however he did get the chance to play for a couple of games in the beginning of the season when Ricardinho was injured and a few other games. In the end he played enough games to win his second Allsvenskan title with the club.

Elanga's contract was not renewed and he moved to his family in Borås to find a new club to play for. On 9 January 2012, he announced his decision to end his playing career to focus on studying for a UEFA Pro Licence and become a coach.

International career
Elanga represented Cameroon national team at the 1998 FIFA World Cup, but did not play as Cameroon was eliminated after the group stage. He won a total of 17 caps for his country.

Personal life
Joseph Elanga is the father of Swedish international Anthony Elanga who plays for Manchester United.

Honours
Malmö FF
Allsvenskan: 2004, 2010

Footnotes

External links
 Joseph Elanga at Malmö FF 
 
 Danish league stats at hvemvandt.dk 
 
 
 

Living people
1979 births
Footballers from Yaoundé
Association football defenders
Association football wingers
Cameroonian footballers
Cameroon international footballers
1998 FIFA World Cup players
PAOK FC players
Apollon Pontou FC players
Malmö FF players
Brøndby IF players
AC Horsens players
Allsvenskan players
Superettan players
Danish Superliga players
Cameroonian expatriate footballers
Cameroonian expatriate sportspeople in Greece
Expatriate footballers in Greece
Cameroonian expatriate sportspeople in Sweden
Expatriate footballers in Sweden
Cameroonian expatriate sportspeople in Denmark
Expatriate men's footballers in Denmark